Vitālijs Aizbalts  (born February 1, 1959) is a Latvian politician. He is a member of the LPP/LC and a deputy of the 9th Saeima (Latvian Parliament). He began his current term in parliament on November 7, 2006. He was born in Daugavpils.

References

External links
Saeima website

1959 births
Living people
Latvia's First Party/Latvian Way politicians
Deputies of the Saeima
21st-century Latvian politicians